El mundo de los vampiros  (The World of the Vampires)  is a 1961 Mexican horror film, directed by Alfonso Corona Blake. The film is about a vampire, Count Sergio Subotai, who seeks revenge against the descendant of an enemy family. The hero is a musician (played by Mauricio Garcés) who knows how to play a piece of music that can kill vampires.

Personnel

Cast
Guillermo Murray as Count Sergio Subotai
Mauricio Garces as Rudolph
Erna Martha Baumann as Martha
Sylvia Fournier as Leonora
Alfredo W. Barron as The Hunchback Familiar
Jose Baviera as The Girls' Father
Mary Carmen Vela
Alicia Moreno
Yolanda Margain
Carlos Nieto

External links

Sci Film
Revista Cinefania

1961 horror films
Mexican black-and-white films
1960s Spanish-language films
Mexican vampire films
Films directed by Alfonso Corona Blake
1961 films
1960s Mexican films